Grassdale may refer to:

Australia
 Grassdale, Queensland, a locality in the Toowoomba Region

United States

 John Coleman House, also known as Grassdale, an NRHP property in Eutaw, Alabama
 Grassdale (Trevilians, Virginia), an NRHP property in Louisa County, Virginia